Lataraha is a small village in Jalley Block in Darbhanga District of Bihar, India. It belongs to Darbhanga Division. The nearest satellite town is Jalley (3 km) and nearest popular market is Pupri (12 km) in Sitamadhi district.

Maithili is the local language. Besides Hindi, Urdu is also spoken. The local language is a variant of Maithili popularly called Thethi Bhasha. Maithili is considered the language of the educated class while Thethi is the language of the common people.

It is connected with Darbhanga district by road. The nearest railway station is at Jogiyara (5 km).

It comes under Jalley Assembly Constituency and Madhubani Parliamentary constituency.

Lataraha is surrounded by Bokhra Block towards west, Nanpur Block towards west, Puri Block towards North, Bisfi Block towards East. Darbhanga, Sitamarhi, Madhubani, Sheohar are the nearby towns.

References

Villages in Darbhanga district